Warren James Kyd  (born 21 November 1939) is a lawyer and former New Zealand politician.

Early life
Kyd was born in Auckland and educated at Mount Albert Grammar School and the University of Auckland. Before entering politics, Kyd was a lawyer. He has four children.

Politics

Kyd was a member of parliament from 1987 to 2002 for the National Party. He was first elected to Parliament in the 1987 election, becoming MP for Clevedon. He held this seat until the 1993 election, when he became MP for Hauraki. In the 2002 election, the Hunua seat was abolished, and Kyd put himself forward for selection as National's candidate in the restored Clevedon seat. Despite a tradition that sitting MPs are not challenged if they seek re-selection, Kyd was defeated by newcomer Judith Collins, with allegations being made that controversial party president Michelle Boag played a part in the decision. Compared to some, Kyd was relatively accepting of his defeat — Brian Neeson, another MP who was not re-selected, eventually quit the National Party to stand as an independent. While in Parliament, Kyd served for a time as a Parliamentary Undersecretary.

After politics
In the 2003 Queen's Birthday Honours, Kyd was appointed a Member of the New Zealand Order of Merit, for public services as a Member of Parliament In 2004, he was appointed chairman of the Auckland Energy Consumer Trust.

References

|-

|-

1939 births
Living people
New Zealand National Party MPs
20th-century New Zealand lawyers
Members of the New Zealand House of Representatives
New Zealand MPs for North Island electorates
People educated at Mount Albert Grammar School
University of Auckland alumni
Members of the New Zealand Order of Merit
21st-century New Zealand politicians